Todor (Bulgarian, and ) is a Bulgarian, Macedonian and Serbian given name, a local rendering of the name Theodore. The Hungarian form of the name is rendered similarly as Tódor. It is the most common name in Bulgarian villages such as Velingrad and Plovdiv.

As a form of the name Theodore, Todor also ultimately comes from the Greek Θεόδωρος (Theodoros), signifying "gift of god", from θεός (theos) "god" and δῶρον (doron) "gift". Slavic equivalents bearing a similar meaning are Bozhidar and Bogdan. The name Todd is similar too but has different meaning.

The Bulgarian diminutives of Todor are Тошко (Toshko), Тошо (Tosho) and Тоше (Toshe) and the Macedonian diminutive is Тоше (Toše) and Тодорче (Todorče).

Notable people
Todor Aleksandrov
Todor Batkov
Todor Burmov
Todor Todorov (disambiguation)
Todor Diev
Todor Ivanchov
Todor Kableshkov
Tódor Kármán
Todor Kolev (disambiguation)
Todor Manojlović
Todor Panitsa
Todor "Toše" Proeski
Todor Gečevski
Todor Skalovski
Todor Stoykov
Todor Veselinović
Todor Zhivkov

See also
 Theodore of Amasea (referred to as "Saint Todor")
 Todorov
 Todorović
 Todorovski

References

Bulgarian masculine given names
Macedonian masculine given names
Serbian masculine given names

hu:Tódor